Puerto La Cruz is a port city located in Anzoátegui State, in Venezuela. It is the seat of the Juan Antonio Sotillo Municipality. The city has road connections to the state capital, Barcelona, to Lecheria and to Guanta.

Geography
The city of Puerto La Cruz is located on the southern shore of the Caribbean. Borders are represented by Mochima National Park, the North Eastern region, and the Coastal Mountains.

History
The history of this settlement began with the arrival of the Spanish to the northern coast of what would eventually become Venezuela.

In 1780, the Christian Mission of Pozuelos was founded by indigenous natives.

On 9 April 1862, a group of 26 families from Margarita Island decided to settle in Pozuelos Bay. As time progressed, this settlement adopted the Virgen del Amparo and the Holy Cross as their religious symbols, celebrating their patron saint on 8 November and iconography on 3 May.

By 1868 the first church was built, and slowly the name of the town was changed to Puerto de la Santa Cruz, later shortened to Puerto La Cruz.

Economy

Puerto La Cruz is the terminus of the  Carapito-Puerto la Cruz oil pipeline, the  San Joaquin-Puerto la Cruz oil pipeline and the  Anaco-Puerto la Cruz gas pipeline.

The city is the gateway to a large national park. The beaches of Mochima National Park surround the city.  Places such as Isla de Plata, Playa Conoma, Isla Arapo and Playa Arapito are known for their beauty.

To the west of the city is the terminal of one of the main ferry lines linking Isla Margarita with the mainland, while to the east is a private marina that caters for tourists and visitors. Day trips are available to visit national park islands such as Playa El Faro, Los Chimanas, Cachicamo and Isla Borracha.

In addition to tourism, the major international banks have established their regional headquarters in the city. A large number of commercial businesses, and large shopping centers are progressively being developed.

Transportation

Large avenues cross the city, from north to south, and from east to west. Among them are:

Av. Municipal, which is the main avenue of the city, with two main traffic lanes and 2 service lanes in each direction, and was the first to be paved.
Av. 5 Julio is the most popular avenue for trade; most shops are owned by immigrants of Arab descent.
Av. Paseo Colon; almost all of this avenue borders the Bay of Pozuelos, which is one of the largest bays in the world. It has a boulevard where the symbol of the city of Puerto La Cruz (the Holy Cross) is situated. In addition here are established known hotels.
Av. Bolivar, with a number of shops devoted to the sale of automotive spare parts, as well as car dealers. Paseo with Connects Miranda Av. Intercommunal Jorge Rodriguez (formerly Avenida Andres Bello), this avenue helps greatly to land transport.
Prolongation Paseo Colon, is a branch of Av. Paseo Colon, starts from the sector Espigón, in front of the Razil Hotel, passes through the Sector El Paraiso, and onwards the Ave. Americo Vespusio to Lechería.

Puerto La Cruz has several ports from which many destinations, attractions, and shopping facilities can be reached. Margarita Island can be reached by the transport service operated by Conferry and Gran Cacique Express (which resumed its activities in December 2006). The beaches located on the islands of Mochima National Park may also be reached from Lechería.

In Guaraguao, Puerto La Cruz, there is also a terminal for the export/import of the crude oil processed at the city's refinery.

Puerto La Cruz does not have its own airport and uses Generál José Antonio Anzoátegui International Airport, in the nearby city of Barcelona.

Mass transportation

According to various sources, local authorities awaited the signature of President Hugo Chávez after negotiating an agreement between the mayors of Puerto La Cruz (Sotillo Municipality) and Barcelona (Bolivar Municipality) and the Chinese company Transtech Engineering Corporation for the construction of a network of modern mass transportation. The target date for the launch of this initiative was August 2007, but since the announcement in March of that year has not been re-appointed over the project.

The first phase of construction of the Metro urban network is expected to last approximately two years to complete. According to various estimates, this would reduce by 50% the volume of traffic that is logged daily in this metropolitan area. This ambitious project involves an air transport infrastructure, with additional sections on land.

Places of interest

Paseo Colon
Andres Eloy Blanco Park
La Toma, San Diego Sector
The Laguna Natural Maguey
Club Terminal Guaraguao

Education

In the city there are various universities, institutes and colleges, among which are the following:

Universities

UDO Universidad de Oriente, Nucleus Anzoátegui Av. Argimiro Gabaldon. Barcelona (Public)
UGMA University Grand Marshal of Ayacucho. Barcelona (Headquarters)
UNIMET Metropolitan University (Graduate Studies)
IUPSM Polytechnic Institute "Santiago Mariño." Barcelona (Headquarters)
USM University of Santa Maria (Nucleus East). Barcelona

Institutes

Institute of Technology Jose Antonio Anzoátegui. (Public).
University Institute of Technology (IUTA) with 2 locations: Barcelona and Puerto La Cruz. (Private).
Institute Monsignor Arias Blanco. (Private).
Instituto Universitario Pedro Maria Freites. (Private).
University Institute of Technology "Antonio José de Sucre" (Private)
University Institute of Technology "Rodolfo Loera Arismendi" (Private).

Schools and Colleges

College Juan Crisostomo Falcon
Carmen Mary College
College Miguel Otero Silva
Salesian College Pius XII
Basic School Great Liberator
L.B Mercedes de Pérez Freites
U.E Angel Mottola
U.E.C Antonio Maria Claret
U.E. Dr. Cristóbal Mendoza
U.E General Isaias Medina Angarita
U.E College Laura Vicuna
U.E Strings Down
U.E Alcazar's Neveri
U.E Bolivarian Guaraguao
U.E Colegio Italo Venezolano, Angelo Marta
U.E Colegio Santa Teresita.
U.E From Jean-Jacques Rousseau Integral Support
Dr U.E. Raúl Leoni
U.E Eloy Guillermo Gonzalez
U.E Eloy Palacios
U.E Gual and Spain
U.E Iberoamericana
Experimental Institute U.E
U.E Jacinto Benavente
U.E Juan Antonio Sotillo
U.E Lights and Virtues
U.E Mother Maria de San Jose
U.E Manuel Placido Maneiro
U.E Maria Montesorri
U.E Martin Tovar & Tovar
U.E Minerva
U.E Our Lady of Fatima
U.E Our Lady of Lourdes
U.E Our Lady of Lourdes II
U.E Romulo Gallegos
U.E San Celestino
U.E Liberator Simón Bolívar
U.E Simon Rodriguez
U.E Tomás Alfaro Calatrava
U.E Virgen del Carmen
U.E Carlos Soublette

International schools:
 Colegio Internacional de Puerto La Cruz (International School of Puerto La Cruz)
 Escuela Las Américas
 QSI International School of Puerto La Cruz in Lechería, previously the Escuela De Las Americas Puerto La Cruz, acquired by Quality Schools International in 2004. (CLOSED)

Spanish Language Schools

Jakera Spanish School Playa Colorada

Gallery Images

Sports

Despite the importance, the city also has a good efficient sports infrastructure; however, work has been carried out in the local sports complex for its full restoration, and to turn it into a real sports town because in these years there has been an increase in the Eastern sports fans.

 Baseball
The city is the home of the baseball team Caribes de Anzoátegui (formerly known as Caribes de Oriente). The team plays at the Estadio Alfonso Chico Carrasquel, which has a capacity of 18,000 spectators.

 Basketball
The city is also home to the professional basketball team Marinos de Anzoátegui (formerly known as Marinos de Oriente), which plays in the Polideportivo Simón Bolívar (formerly known as Polideportivo Luis Ramos), better known today as the Caldera del Diablo.

 Football
The city has 2 football stadiums.

The Jose Antonio Anzoátegui stadium, with a capacity of 40,000 spectators, hosted some of the Copa América 2007 matches among teams from Brazil, Mexico, Chile and Ecuador. The stadium is the home ground of the football team  Deportivo Anzoátegui, which plays in the First Division of Venezuela.

The other stadium, the Salvador de la Plaza stadium, hosts the football team Inter Anzoátegui, which plays in the Third Division.

Sports clubs

Baseball: Caribes de Anzoátegui.
Basketball: Marinos de Anzoátegui.
Football: Deportivo Anzoátegui and Inter Anzoátegui

Sister cities

Notable people 

 Asdrúbal Cabrera – Baseball player
 Eliézer Alfonzo – Baseball player
 Freddy Guevara – Politician
 Edymar Martínez – Model and Miss International 2015
 Zdeněk Chovanec – Racing driver
 Valentina Figuera – Model and Miss Grand International 2019

Media

TV

Televisora de Oriente "TVO"
Puerto TV
Anzoátegui TV
OrbitAaTV
Telecaribe

Radio

La Mega de Puerto La Cruz 100.9
Éxitos de Puerto La Cruz
Ultra Estéreo de Puerto La Cruz
CNB de Puerto La Cruz 93.7
Vértice de Puerto La Cruz
Plaza
Exitosa
Actualidad 640 AM
Lasser 97.7
Caribe 102.7
Marina 103.7
Cielo
News
Rumbera 94.5
Turística FM
Radio Puerto La Cruz (760 am)
Orbita 107.5 FM

Periodicals
 El Tiempo: Leading daily Anzoátegui State
It has two editions for Anzoátegui (North and Central-South) and one for the state of Sucre.

El Norte
La Nueva Prensa de Oriente

References

External links

 
Cities in Anzoátegui
Port cities in Venezuela
Ports and harbours of Venezuela
1862 establishments in Venezuela